Nathaniel Shipman (August 22, 1828 – June 26, 1906) was a United States circuit judge of the United States Court of Appeals for the Second Circuit and of the United States Circuit Courts for the Second Circuit and previously was a United States district judge of the United States District Court for the District of Connecticut.

Education and career

Born on August 22, 1828, in Southbury, Connecticut, Shipman graduated from Yale University in 1848 and attended Yale Law School, then read law in 1850. He entered private practice in Hartford, Connecticut from 1850 to 1873. He was a member of the Connecticut House of Representatives in 1857. He was executive secretary for Governor of Connecticut William Alfred Buckingham from 1858 to 1863.

Federal judicial service

Shipman received a recess appointment from President Ulysses S. Grant on April 16, 1873, to a seat on the United States District Court for the District of Connecticut vacated by Judge William Davis Shipman. He was nominated to the same position by President Grant on December 2, 1873. He was confirmed by the United States Senate on December 8, 1873, and received his commission the same day. His service terminated on March 22, 1892, due to his elevation to the Second Circuit.

Shipman was nominated by President Benjamin Harrison on December 16, 1891, to the United States Court of Appeals for the Second Circuit and the United States Circuit Courts for the Second Circuit, to a new joint seat authorized by 26 Stat. 826. He was confirmed by the Senate on March 17, 1892, and received his commission the same day. His service terminated on March 22, 1902, due to his retirement.

Other service

Concurrent with his federal judicial service, Shipman was a lecturer for Yale Law School in 1889.

Death

Shipman died on June 26, 1906, in Hartford and was interred at Cedar Hill Cemetery.

References

Sources
 
 

|-

1828 births
1906 deaths
19th-century American judges
Burials at Cedar Hill Cemetery (Hartford, Connecticut)
Connecticut lawyers
Judges of the United States Court of Appeals for the Second Circuit
Judges of the United States District Court for the District of Connecticut
Members of the Connecticut House of Representatives
People from Southbury, Connecticut
United States federal judges admitted to the practice of law by reading law
United States federal judges appointed by Benjamin Harrison
United States federal judges appointed by Ulysses S. Grant
Yale Law School alumni